Myrna Wooders (born 1950) is a Canadian economist who has made significant contributions to public economic theory, network theory and game theory. Specifically, her work has focused on coalition theory, public good theory and club theory. Myrna currently is a professor of economics at Vanderbilt University and the University of Warwick.

Wooders completed her PhD under Leo Hurwicz. She is editor of the Journal of Public Economic Theory, Fellow of the Econometric Society, Charter Member of the Game Theory Society, and the founding editor of Economics Bulletin. She currently serves as an elected member of the Game Theory Society Council and holds the Presidency of the Association of Public Economic Theory.

Early life
Myrna Wooders grew up on a small farm in rural Alberta, Canada. Her father had a ninth grade education—the best one offered when he was a boy—and preferred helping out the neighbors by fixing their machinery to working on his farm. Her mother, who completed grade seven, loved planting and growing trees, flowers and gardens so while the trees have been called "the finest stand of trees in Eastern Alberta", the paying crops did not pay so well. Myrna spent hours each summer, as a small child, carrying water to the trees. She was the tallest of four sisters and that may be why she was chosen to be the farm worker of the bunch. She missed a couple of months of school each year to help on the farm. But much can be learned doing physical labor. Working in a granary during harvest time, leveling out the grain as it fell from the thrasher into the granary, she learned to keep shoveling (it was either that, or be buried alive). Until grade 9, with the discovery of the mailing services of the Library of the University of Alberta, there were few books to read; the family was not religious but some summers there was only the Bible. Myrna had children at a young age, prior to undergraduate studies, and became a photographer in another small Alberta town. With her two children in tow, she went on to complete her undergraduate studies at the University of Alberta and her PhD at the University of Minnesota.

Academic career
Professor Wooders research focuses on public economic theory (particularly tax competition and the theory of local public goods), club theory (especially the relationship between markets and clubs), and coalition theory (particularly cooperative games with many players and their relationship to markets).

Myrna Wooders lives in Nashville, Tennessee, with her plants. She is the mother of the economist John Wooders,
Professor of Economics of the University of Arizona and grandmother of Sarah Wooders, founder of Allparel, a clothes shopping site based on machine learning to determine accurate clothing labels. 

Myrna is an avid lover of birds and 1940's cars, and has started a local brewery in Midtown of Nashville called "Cars and Birds from the 1940's". It doesn't serve any alcohol, but is rather more of a sanctuary for the birds and the cars and such. Admission is free, but a donation is recommended to her charity The Wooders foundation, which strives to continue upon the legacy of birds and cars that have roamed this Earth since even before Myrna. 

Love squash? So does Myrna! In fact, 2022 marked the 15th anniversary of the 'Wooders' squash, which is a hybrid of butternut and the figleaf gourd. According to Wooders, the squash reminds her of "the fleeting grace that only comes about when humanity's involvement in agriculture perfectly dances with the ideals of Mother Nature".

References

External links
University of Queensland, Brisbane, write-up of Myrna Wooders
Vanderbilt page for Myrna Wooders
 

Fellows of the Econometric Society
Canadian economists
Canadian women economists
Living people
Game theorists
University of Minnesota alumni
Vanderbilt University faculty
Academics of the University of Warwick
Academic staff of the University of Toronto
Stony Brook University faculty
1950 births